The 1991–92 Hartford Whalers season saw the Whalers finish in fourth place in the Adams Division with a record of 26 wins, 41 losses, and 13 ties for 65 points. They lost the Adams Division semi-finals in seven games to the Montreal Canadiens, with Russ Courtnall scoring in double overtime of Game 7 at the Montreal Forum to end Hartford's season. This was the last time that the Whalers made the playoffs before moving to North Carolina.

Off-season
On May 29, the Whalers announced that head coach Rick Ley was relieved of his duties as head coach of the team. In two seasons, Ley led Hartford to a 69-71-20 record, earning two playoff berths.

On the following day, May 30, the Whalers lost Dave Babych to the Minnesota North Stars at the 1991 NHL Dispersal and Expansion Drafts. Babych appeared in only eight games with Hartford during the 1990-91 season, earning six assists. In 349 career games with the Whalers, Babych scored 44 goals and earned 240 points since joining the team in the 1985-86 season.

The Whalers announced the hiring of Jimmy Roberts as the new head coach of the club on June 7. Roberts was the head coach of the Springfield Indians from 1988-1991, leading the club to two Calder Cup championships in 1989-90 and 1990-91. Roberts had previous NHL head coaching experience with the Buffalo Sabres during the 1982-83 season, as he led the club to a 21-16-8 record in 45 games. As a player, Roberts played in 1006 career games with the Montreal Canadiens and St. Louis Blues in a career that spanned from 1963-1978. Roberts won five Stanley Cups as a player.

On June 21, the Whalers selected goaltender Shaun Gravistin from the University of Alaska Anchorage in the 1991 NHL Supplemental Draft.

The next day, the Whalers participated at the 1991 NHL Entry Draft held at the Buffalo Memorial Auditorium in Buffalo, New York. With the ninth overall selection in the first round, the club selected Patrick Poulin from the Saint-Hyacinthe Laser of the Quebec Major Junior Hockey League. In 56 games during the 1990-91 season, Poulin scored 32 goals and 70 points. In the third round, with the 59th overall selection, the Whalers selected Michael Nylander from Huddinge IK. In 33 games, Nylander scored 14 goals and 34 points. The only other player from the draft that would eventually play in the NHL was Jim Storm, who the Whalers selected in the fourth round.

On August 26, the Whalers acquired Paul Fenton from the Calgary Flames in exchange for future considerations. The future considerations would be a sixth round draft pick in the 1992 NHL Entry Draft. Fenton scored 10 goals and 27 points in 61 games as he split the 1990-91 with the Toronto Maple Leafs and Calgary Flames.

The Whalers signed free agent Mario Gosselin on September 4. Gosselin played with the Phoenix Roadrunners of the IHL, posting a 24-15-4 record with a 3.86 GAA during the 1990-91 season. In 218 career NHL games, Gosselin earned a record of 86-94-13 with a 3.69 GAA while playing with the Quebec Nordiques and Los Angeles Kings from 1983-90.

The very next day, on September 5, the club announced the signing of Barry Pederson. Pederson spent the 1990-91 season with the Pittsburgh Penguins, scoring six goals and 14 points in 46 games. In 1982-83, Pederson scored a career high 46 goals while with the Boston Bruins. The next season with the Bruins in 1983-84, Pederson scored a career high 116 points. In 1986, the Bruins traded him to the Vancouver Canucks in exchange for Cam Neely and the Canucks first round selection at the 1987 NHL Entry Draft, in which Boston selected Glen Wesley.

On September 8, the Whalers traded Sylvain Cote to the Washington Capitals for future considerations. In 382 career games with Hartford, Cote scored 31 goals and 92 points since he broke into the NHL during the 1983-84 season. To complete the trade, the Capitals sent their second round draft pick in the 1992 NHL Entry Draft.

The Whalers remained busy in September, as on September 17, the club acquired Andrew Cassels from the Montreal Canadiens in exchange for the Whalers second round selection in the 1992 NHL Entry Draft. Cassels, the Canadiens first round draft pick with the 17th overall selection in the 1987 NHL Entry Draft, scored six goals and 25 points in 51 games with Montreal during the 1990-91 season.

On October 2, the Whalers acquired Dan Keczmer from the San Jose Sharks in exchange for recently signed free agent Paul Fenton. Keczmer appeared in nine games with the Minnesota North Stars during the 1990-91, earning an assist. In 60 games with the Kalamazoo Wings of the IHL, Keczmer scored four goals and 24 points.

The next day, on October 3, the Whalers traded Todd Krygier to the Washington Capitals in exchange for a fourth round draft pick in the 1993 NHL Entry Draft. Krygier scored 13 goals and 30 points in 72 games with the Whalers in the 1990-91 season. On the same day, Hartford acquired Lee Norwood from the New Jersey Devils in exchange for the Whalers fifth round draft pick in the 1993 NHL Entry Draft. Norwood split the 1990-91 season between the Detroit Red Wings and the Devils, as in 49 games, he scored six goals and 15 points.

NHL draft
Hartford's draft picks at the 1991 NHL Entry Draft held at the Buffalo Memorial Auditorium in Buffalo, New York.

Regular season

Final standings

Schedule and results

Regular season

|- style="background:#fcc;"
| 1 || October 5, 1991 || @ Quebec || 2–4 || || || Quebec Coliseum || || 0–1–0 || 0 || L1
|- style="background:#ffc;"
| 2 || October 8, 1991 || Montreal || 2–2 || OT || || Hartford Civic Center || || 0–1–1 || 1 || T1
|- style="background:#cfc;"
| 3 || October 12, 1991 || N.Y. Rangers || 5–2 || || || Hartford Civic Center || || 1–1–1 || 3 || W1
|- style="background:#cfc;"
| 4 || October 14, 1991 || @ Montreal || 4–3 || || || Montreal Forum || || 2–1–1 || 5 || W2
|- style="background:#cfc;"
| 5 || October 16, 1991 || @ Winnipeg || 3–2 || || || Winnipeg Arena || || 3–1–1 || 7 || W3
|- style="background:#cfc;"
| 6 || October 19, 1991 || Buffalo || 4–1 || || || Hartford Civic Center || || 4–1–1 || 9 || W4
|- style="background:#cfc;"
| 7 || October 23, 1991 || San Jose || 3–0 || || || Hartford Civic Center || || 5–1–1 || 11 || W5
|- style="background:#fcc;"
| 8 || October 26, 1991 || Chicago || 2–4 || || || Hartford Civic Center || || 5–2–1 || 11 || L1
|- style="background:#fcc;"
| 9 || October 27, 1991 || @ Buffalo || 1–5 || || || Buffalo Memorial Auditorium || || 5–3–1 || 11 || L2
|- style="background:#ffc;"
| 10 || October 30, 1991 || Los Angeles || 4–4 || OT || || Hartford Civic Center || || 5–3–2 || 12 || T1
|-

|- style="background:#fcc;"
| 11 || November 1, 1991 || @ Detroit || 5–8 || || || Hartford Civic Center || || 5–4–2 || 12 || L1
|- style="background:#cfc;"
| 12 || November 2, 1991 || @ Pittsburgh || 6–5 || || || Pittsburgh Civic Arena || || 6–4–2 || 14 || W1
|- style="background:#fcc;"
| 13 || November 6, 1991 || Calgary || 2–3 || || || Hartford Civic Center || || 6–5–2 || 14 || L1
|- style="background:#cfc;"
| 14 || November 9, 1991 || @ St. Louis || 4–3 || || || St. Louis Arena || || 7–5–2 || 16 || W1
|- style="background:#fcc;"
| 15 || November 10, 1991 || @ Chicago || 0–3 || || || Chicago Stadium || || 7–6–2 || 16 || L1
|- style="background:#cfc;"
| 16 || November 12, 1991 || Quebec || 5–4 || || || Hartford Civic Center || || 8–6–2 || 18 || W1
|- style="background:#ffc;"
| 17 || November 14, 1991 || Montreal || 2–2 || OT || || Hartford Civic Center || || 8–6–3 || 19 || T1
|- style="background:#fcc;"
| 18 || November 16, 1991 || Boston || 4–5 || OT || || Hartford Civic Center || || 8–7–3 || 19 || L1
|- style="background:#cfc;"
| 19 || November 17, 1991 || @ Toronto || 3–1 || || || Maple Leaf Gardens || || 9–7–3 || 21 || W1
|- style="background:#fcc;"
| 20 || November 22, 1991 || @ New Jersey || 2–8 || || || Brendan Byrne Arena || || 9–8–3 || 21 || L1
|- style="background:#fcc;"
| 21 || November 23, 1991 || Washington || 2–3 || || || Hartford Civic Center || || 9–9–3 || 21 || L2
|- style="background:#fcc;"
| 22 || November 25, 1991 || @ Quebec || 2–5 || || || Quebec Coliseum || || 9–10–3 || 21 || L3
|- style="background:#cfc;"
| 23 || November 27, 1991 || @ Philadelphia || 7–3 || || || The Spectrum || || 10–10–3 || 23 || W1
|- style="background:#cfc;"
| 24 || November 30, 1991 || Montreal || 3–2 || || || Hartford Civic Center || || 11–10–3 || 25 || W2
|-

|- style="background:#fcc;"
| 25 || December 1, 1991 || @ Boston || 4–5 || || || Boston Garden || || 11–11–3 || 25 || L1
|- style="background:#fcc;"
| 26 || December 4, 1991 || Toronto || 0–3 || || || Hartford Civic Center || || 11–12–3 || 25 || L2
|- style="background:#ffc;"
| 27 || December 7, 1991 || Buffalo || 6–6 || OT || || Hartford Civic Center || || 11–12–4 || 26 || T1
|- style="background:#cfc;"
| 28 || December 13, 1991 || @ Buffalo || 8–4 || || || Buffalo Memorial Auditorium || || 12–12–4 || 28 || W1
|- style="background:#fcc;"
| 29 || December 14, 1991 || N.Y. Rangers || 2–6 || || || Hartford Civic Center || || 12–13–4 || 28 || L1
|- style="background:#fcc;"
| 30 || December 17, 1991 || N.Y. Islanders || 2–4 || || || Hartford Civic Center || || 12–14–4 || 28 || L2
|- style="background:#fcc;"
| 31 || December 19, 1991 || New Jersey || 1–4 || || || Hartford Civic Center || || 12–15–4 || 28 || L3
|- style="background:#fcc;"
| 32 || December 21, 1991 || @ Montreal || 2–3 || OT || || Montreal Forum || || 12–16–4 || 28 || L4
|- style="background:#cfc;"
| 33 || December 23, 1991 || Buffalo || 4–3 || || || Hartford Civic Center || || 13–16–4 || 30 || W1
|- style="background:#fcc;"
| 34 || December 26, 1991 || @ Boston || 2–3 || || || Boston Garden || || 13–17–4 || 30 || L1
|- style="background:#fcc;"
| 35 || December 28, 1991 || @ Quebec || 1–4 || || || Quebec Coliseum || || 13–18–4 || 30 || L2
|- style="background:#cfc;"
| 36 || December 29, 1991 || N.Y. Islanders || 6–4 || || || Hartford Civic Center || || 14–18–4 || 32 || W1
|-

|- style="background:#cfc;"
| 37 || January 2, 1992 || Quebec || 4–1 || || || Hartford Civic Center || || 15–18–4 || 34 || W2
|- style="background:#ffc;"
| 38 || January 4, 1992 || Washington || 2–2 || OT || || Hartford Civic Center || || 15–18–5 || 35 || T1
|- style="background:#fcc;"
| 39 || January 9, 1992 || @ N.Y. Islanders || 1–2 || || || Nassau Coliseum || || 15–19–5 || 35 || L1
|- style="background:#fcc;"
| 40 || January 11, 1992 || @ Montreal || 2–3 || || || Montreal Forum || || 15–20–5 || 35 || L2
|- style="background:#fcc;"
| 41 || January 15, 1992 || Boston || 3–4 || || || Hartford Civic Center || || 15–21–5 || 35 || L3
|- style="background:#fcc;"
| 42 || January 16, 1992 || @ Boston || 3–4 || OT || || Boston Garden || || 15–22–5 || 35 || L4
|- style="text-align:center; background:#bbcaff;"
| colspan="11" | 43rd All-Star Game in Philadelphia, Pennsylvania
|- style="background:#ffc;"
| 43 || January 21, 1992 || Winnipeg || 3–3 || OT || || Hartford Civic Center || || 15–22–6 || 36 || T1
|- style="background:#ffc;"
| 44 || January 25, 1992 || Boston || 4–4 || OT || || Hartford Civic Center || || 15–22–7 || 37 || T2
|- style="background:#fcc;"
| 45 || January 26, 1992 || @ Montreal || 1–3 || || || Montreal Forum || || 15–23–7 || 37 || L1
|- style="background:#fcc;"
| 46 || January 28, 1992 || Minnesota || 3–4 || || || Hartford Civic Center || || 15–24–7 || 37 || L2
|- style="background:#fcc;"
| 47 || January 31, 1992 || @ Edmonton || 1–4 || || || Northlands Coliseum || || 15–25–7 || 37 || L3
|-

|- style="background:#ffc;"
| 48 || February 1, 1992 || @ Vancouver || 4–4 || OT || || Pacific Coliseum || || 15–25–8 || 38 || T1
|- style="background:#fcc;"
| 49 || February 4, 1992 || @ San Jose || 5–6 || || || Cow Palace || || 15–26–8 || 38 || L1
|- style="background:#ffc;"
| 50 || February 6, 1992 || @ Los Angeles || 5–5 || OT || || Great Western Forum || || 15–26–9 || 39 || T1
|- style="background:#ffc;"
| 51 || February 9, 1992 || Minnesota || 4–4 || OT || || Hartford Civic Center || || 15–26–10 || 40 || T2
|- style="background:#cfc;"
| 52 || February 11, 1992 || Buffalo || 5–1 || || || Hartford Civic Center || || 16–26–10 || 42 || W1
|- style="background:#fcc;"
| 53 || February 13, 1992 || Edmonton || 1–3 || || || Hartford Civic Center || || 16–27–10 || 42 || L1
|- style="background:#fcc;"
| 54 || February 15, 1992 || @ New Jersey || 1–4 || || || Hartford Civic Center || || 16–28–10 || 44 || W1
|- style="background:#fcc;"
| 55 || February 16, 1992 || @ Buffalo || 4–5 || || || Buffalo Memorial Auditorium || || 16–29–10 || 44 || L1
|- style="background:#ffc;"
| 56 || February 19, 1992 || Montreal || 2–2 || OT || || Hartford Civic Center || || 16–29–11 || 45 || T1
|- style="background:#cfc;"
| 57 || February 22, 1992 || Quebec || 4–0 || || || Hartford Civic Center || || 17–29–11 || 45 || L1
|- style="background:#fcc;"
| 58 || February 23, 1992 || Detroit || 0–4 || || || Hartford Civic Center || || 17–30–11 || 45 || L2
|- style="background:#fcc;"
| 59 || February 25, 1992 || St. Louis || 2–5 || || || Hartford Civic Center || || 17–31–11 || 45 || L3
|- style="background:#cfc;"
| 60 || February 27, 1992 || @ Pittsburgh || 8–4 || || || Pittsburgh Civic Arena || || 18–31–11 || 47 || W1
|- style="background:#cfc;"
| 61 || February 29, 1992 || @ Minnesota || 5–4 || || || Met Center || || 19–31–11 || 49 || W2
|-

|- style="background:#fcc;"
| 62 || March 1, 1992 || @ N.Y. Rangers || 4–9 || || || Madison Square Garden || || 19–32–11 || 49 || L1
|- style="background:#cfc;"
| 63 || March 3, 1992 || Boston || 4–0 || || || Hartford Civic Center || || 20–32–11 || 51 || W1
|- style="background:#fcc;"
| 64 || March 5, 1992 || Quebec || 4–10 || || || Hartford Civic Center || || 20–33–11 || 51 || L1
|- style="background:#fcc;"
| 65 || March 7, 1992 || Vancouver || 1–5 || || || Hartford Civic Center || || 20–34–11 || 51 || L2
|- style="background:#fcc;"
| 66 || March 9, 1992 || @ Quebec || 0–2 || || || Quebec Coliseum || || 20–35–11 || 51 || L3
|- style="background:#cfc;"
| 67 || March 11, 1992 || Los Angeles || 4–0 || || || Hartford Civic Center || || 21–35–11 || 53 || W1
|- style="background:#cfc;"
| 68 || March 13, 1992 || @ Winnipeg || 1–0 || || || Winnipeg Arena || || 22–35–11 || 55 || W2
|- style="background:#fcc;"
| 69 || March 14, 1992 || @ Edmonton || 1–3 || || || Northlands Coliseum || || 22–36–11 || 55 || L1
|- style="background:#cfc;"
| 70 || March 16, 1992 || @ Calgary || 4–3 || || || Olympic Saddledome || || 23–36–11 || 57 || W1
|- style="background:#fcc;"
| 71 || March 18, 1992 || @ Vancouver || 2–3 || || || Pacific Coliseum || || 23–37–11 || 57 || L1
|- style="background:#fcc;"
| 72 || March 21, 1992 || San Jose || 4–5 || || || Hartford Civic Center || || 23–38–11 || 57 || L2
|- style="background:#ffc;"
| 73 || March 22, 1992 || Pittsburgh || 2–2 || OT || || Hartford Civic Center || || 23–38–12 || 58 || T1
|- style="background:#cfc;"
| 74 || March 24, 1992 || @ Washington || 8–2 || || || Capital Centre || || 24–38–12 || 60 || W1
|- style="background:#fcc;"
| 75 || March 26, 1992 || @ St. Louis || 2–7 || || || Hartford Civic Center || || 24–39–12 || 60 || L1
|- style="background:#fcc;"
| 76 || March 28, 1992 || Chicago || 1–3 || || || Hartford Civic Center || || 24–40–12 || 60 || L2
|- style="background:#ffc;"
| 77 || March 29, 1992 || @ Buffalo || 2–2 || OT || || Buffalo Memorial Auditorium || || 24–40–13 || 61 || T1
|-

|- style="background:#cfc;"
| 78 || April 12, 1992 || Philadelphia || 4–2 || || || Hartford Civic Center || || 25–40–13 || 63 || W1
|- style="background:#fcc;"
| 79 || April 13, 1992 || @ Boston || 3–6 || || || Boston Garden || || 25–41–13 || 63 || L1
|- style="background:#cfc;"
| 80 || April 15, 1992 || @ Philadelphia || 4–3 || OT || || The Spectrum || || 26–41–13 || 65 || W1
|-

|-
| 1991–92 schedule

Playoffs

Player statistics

Regular season
Scoring

Goaltending

Playoffs
Scoring

Goaltending

Note: GP = Games played; G = Goals; A = Assists; Pts = Points; +/- = Plus-minus PIM = Penalty minutes; PPG = Power-play goals; SHG = Short-handed goals; GWG = Game-winning goals;
      MIN = Minutes played; W = Wins; L = Losses; T = Ties; GA = Goals against; GAA = Goals-against average;  SO = Shutouts; SA=Shots against; SV=Shots saved; SV% = Save percentage;

Transactions
The Whalers were involved in the following transactions during the 1991–92 season.

Trades

Free agents

References

1991-92 Hartford Whalers at Hockey Reference

1991-92
1991–92 NHL season by team
1991–92 in American ice hockey by team
Hart
Hart